Wiązownica  (Vyazivnytsia) is a village in Jarosław County, Subcarpathian Voivodeship, in south-eastern Poland. It is the seat of the gmina (administrative district) called Gmina Wiązownica.

The village has a population of 1,700.

The village was a place of Wiązownica massacre in 1945 when Ukrainian nationalists slaughtered around 100 Polish civilians.

References

Villages in Jarosław County